The Château de Dinan consists of a keep, in the town of Dinan, in the Côtes-d'Armor département of the 
Brittany region of France.

It is called Donjon de la duchesse Anne (Keep of the Duchess Anne), and stands 111 feet (34m) high near the Saint Louis gate. John V, Duke of Brittany built the keep in 1382–1383. The keep is formed by a union of two tall circular towers; a moat and drawbridge divides the keep from the outside of the ramparts as well as from the inside of the city, providing a stronghold both against outsiders and from the townspeople themselves. Extensive machicolations overhang the wall head providing defensive coverage of the base of the tower.

The castle was listed for protection as a monument historique in 1886. It is owned by the commune and houses the local museum.

History
The castle is nearly 1000 years old and is one of the earliest castles, due to the fact that it appeared in the Bayeux Tapestry.

See Also

List of castles in France

Chateau

Notes

External links 
 Official site (in French)
 Le château de Dinan (article in French)
 

Castles in Brittany
Châteaux in Côtes-d'Armor
Museums in Côtes-d'Armor
Local museums in France
Monuments historiques of Côtes-d'Armor